Heiðarvíga saga or The Story of the Heath-Slayings is one of the Icelanders' sagas. It is badly preserved; 12 leaves of the only surviving manuscript were destroyed along with their only copy in the fire of Copenhagen in 1728. The content of the destroyed portion is only known through a summary written from memory by Icelandic scholar Jón Grunnvíkingur (1705–1779). This is the only form in which the saga's contents survive today.  The saga has been taken by some scholars as possibly among the oldest Icelanders' sagas.

The saga tells of the descendants of Egil Skallagrímsson and the long-standing disputes and conflicts which culminated in the Battle of the Heath-Slayings (Heiðarvíg).

References

Related reading
Jesse Byock (1993) Feud in the Icelandic Saga (University of California Press) 
Vidar Hreinsson (1997) The complete sagas of Icelanders, including 49 tales (Leifur Eiríksson Pub)

External links
 Full text and English translation (The Saga of the Heath Slayings) at the Icelandic Saga Database 
Heiðarvíga Saga The saga with standardized Modern Icelandic spelling 
 Two Borgfirðinga sögur: the oldest or the youngest Íslendingasögur? Alison Finlay,  University of London
Proverbs and proverbial materials in Heiðarvíga saga

Sagas of Icelanders